Gerhard II of Holstein-Plön (1254 - 28 October 1312), nicknamed the Blind, was Count of Holstein-Plön from 1290 to 1312.

Life 
He was the second son of Gerhard I, Count of Holstein-Itzehoe and Elisabeth of Mecklenburg.

After his father's death in 1290, the county was divided among the surviving sons.  Gerhard II received Holstein-Plön; his younger brother Adolph VI received Holstein-Schauenburg and Henry received Holstein-Rendsburg.

Seal 
The seal reads

"Seal of Count Gerhard of Hostein and Schauenburg"

Marriages and issue 
He married on 12 December 1275 the Swedish Princess Ingeborg, a daughter of King Valdemar of Sweden.  They had four children:
 Catherine ( - before 1300)
 Gerhard IV (1277-1323), Count of Holstein-Plön
 Valdemar ( - 29 July 1306), Count of Holstein-Schauenburg, died after the Second Battle of Uetersen

 Elizabeth ( - 20 July 1318 or 1319), married Otto I, Duke of Pomerania

In 1293 Gerhard married Agnes of Brandenburg, the widow of King Eric V of Denmark.  With her, he had a son:
 John III ( - 27 September 1359), Count of Holstein in Kiel from 1312 until his death.

Ancestors

References 
 Johann Friedrich Camerer: Vermischte historisch-politische Nachrichten, 1762

Plön
Counts of Holstein
House of Schauenburg
1254 births
1312 deaths
13th-century German nobility